John Reddish (22 December 1904 – 18 October 1989), was an English footballer and cricketer. He played for Boots Athletic, Tottenham Hotspur, Lincoln City, Notts County and Dundee. He was born in Nottingham, Nottinghamshire.

Reddish began his career as footballer with local non-League club Boots Athletic. He joined Tottenham Hotspur in 1929 and played a total of seven matches in all competitions for the Spurs. After leaving White Hart Lane the full back joined Lincoln City where he made 53 appearances. Later on his career he had a spell at Notts County and finally Dundee.

As cricketer, Reddish was a right-handed batsman who bowled leg break googly; he made a single first-class appearance for Nottinghamshire against Oxford University in 1930.

He died at Manchester, Lancashire on 18 October 1989.

References

External links
John Reddish at Cricinfo
John Reddish at CricketArchive

1904 births
1989 deaths
Footballers from Nottingham
English footballers
Association football fullbacks
Boots Athletic F.C. players
Tottenham Hotspur F.C. players
Lincoln City F.C. players
Notts County F.C. players
Dundee F.C. players
English Football League players
Cricketers from Nottingham
English cricketers
Nottinghamshire cricketers